Soar-y-mynydd or Soar y mynydd is a Calvinist Methodist chapel near the eastern extremity of the large parish of Llanddewi Brefi, Ceredigion. It is claimed to be the remotest chapel in Wales (“capel mwyaf pellennig/anghysbell Cymru gyfan”). Its name is Welsh for ‘Zoar of the mountain’. Zoar or its Welsh equivalent Soar is a not uncommon chapel name in Wales which derives from the mention in Genesis 19:20–30 of the place which served as a sanctuary for Lot and his daughters and which was spared by God when the cities of Sodom and Gomorrah were destroyed.

Location 
Soar-y-mynydd stands in the valley of the river Camddwr in the Cambrian Mountains, near the eastern border of Ceredigion (National Grid Reference SN 7847 5328). It is some eight miles south-east of Tregaron on the road to Llyn Brianne.

Calvinistic Methodists 
The Calvinistic Methodists are a Welsh Protestant revivalist movement forming the Presbyterian Church of Wales. They trace their origins back to the evangelism and preaching of George Whitefield and especially Howell Harris in the late 1730s and 40s. They formed a separate body from the Church of England and from other Methodists after 1821, when their Rules of Discipline were published, followed in 1823 by their Confession of Faith based on the predestinationist Five Points of Calvinism. The working language of the Calvinistic Methodists has always been Welsh, and the services at Soar-y-mynydd are held in Welsh.

History 
The chapel was built in 1822, immediately following the independence of the Calvinistic Methodists. The prime mover was Rev. Ebenezer Richard, minister at Tregaron and father of peace campaigner Henry Richard, with his trustees, and the land was provided by John Jones, the then farmer at Nant-llwyd lower down the valley of the river Camddwr. It served the people of the sheep farms for several miles round about. The congregation had fallen to 2 in 1968 and Soar was threatened with closure, but since 1973 its status has been secured. Since its formal reopening in that year, publicity has meant that some well-attended summer services with visiting preachers are now held on the last Sunday in August. The chapel also now attracts artistic attention; it was painted for example by Ogwyn Davies in 1993, and has featured in poems for example by Harri Webb and Iwan Llwyd. The chapel closed for two years during the COVID-19 pandemic but reopened for services in May 2022.

Architecture and environment 
Soar-y-mynydd is a simple Cadw grade II*-listed building made of local rubble stone collected from riverbeds and ruined farmsteads in the area. It is whitewashed on the outside. It consists of a traditional rectangular side-wall façade chapel at the northern end, attached to a small two-storey house with two chimney-stacks on the ridge, under a single slate roof; the house is now derelict. The chapel is entered on the longer east side through two pairs of doors, and the pulpit is located between the two doorways. A prominent feature is the painted scroll above the pulpit with the text “Duw cariad yw”, i.e. ‘God is love’ (First Epistle of John 4:8 and 4:16), dating from 1911. The local school met in the chapel-house until the 1940s. The chapel enclosure is walled in stone and skirted by mature trees. On the east side of the building is a graveyard, the oldest apparent stone being from 1856. The most conspicuous is the most recent (2001), that of Professor John Griffiths, a prominent London cancer surgeon.

Sources and literature 
Cadw (1997) Listed buildings detail report, records 18943 (building) and 18950 (outbuilding and wall).

Evans, Dyfed (1955) Soar y Mynydd. Y Cymro, 8 September 1955.

Evans, John (1904) Hanes Methodistiaeth rhan ddeheuol Sir Aberteifi, 1735–1900. Dolgellau: E. W. Evans.

Gruffydd, William John, pseud. ‘Elerydd’, ed. (1994) Tua Soar. Capel Soar y Mynydd. [3rd edition (or printing) 1997.]

Jones, Evan (1979) Cymdogaeth Soar-y-mynydd. Swansea/Abertawe: Christopher Davies (Cyfres cynefin).

Jones, Huw, ed. Lyn Ebenezer (2007) Bugail olaf y Cwm. Llanrwst: Gwasg Carreg Gwalch.

Perrin, Jim (2008) Country diary: Soar y Mynydd. The Guardian, 26 July 2008.

Richards, E. E. (Lynne) (2004) Soar y Mynydd. Cardiganshire Family History Society Journal  3.9 (October), 202–205.

References

External links 

General:

 Coates, Richard (2017) Soar-y-mynydd, Ceredigion. University of the West of England Repository..
 Hicks, Gareth (2007) Ceredigion chapels database: Llanddewi Brefi. .
 Rees, Ben (2010) Soar-y-Mynydd. Cymanfa’r Sul 2010. Web-page of Cymdeithas Dydd yr Arglwydd yng Nghymru. .
 Pike, David E. (2011) Soar-y-Mynydd: revival at the remotest chapel in Wales. .
 Photos of Soar-y-mynydd and the surrounding area today. .

Methodist churches in Wales
Grade II* listed churches in Ceredigion
Chapels in Ceredigion